Leonard Horace Williams (17 May 1898–1932) was an English footballer who played in the Football League for Sheffield Wednesday, Stockport County, Swansea Town and Wolverhampton Wanderers.

References

1898 births
1932 deaths
English footballers
Association football defenders
English Football League players
Silverwood Colliery F.C. players
Wath Athletic F.C. players
Sheffield Wednesday F.C. players
Stockport County F.C. players
Wolverhampton Wanderers F.C. players
Swansea City A.F.C. players
Telford United F.C. players
Oswestry Town F.C. players